
Gmina Rajgród is an urban-rural gmina (administrative district) in Grajewo County, Podlaskie Voivodeship, in north-eastern Poland.

Villages
Apart from the town of Rajgród, Gmina Rajgród contains the villages and settlements of Bełda, Biebrza, Budy, Bukowo, Ciszewo, Czarna Wieś, Danowo, Karczewo, Karwowo, Kołaki, Kosiły, Kosówka, Kozłówka, Kuligi, Łazarze, Miecze, Orzechówka, Pieńczykówek, Pieńczykowo, Pikły, Przejma, Przestrzele, Rybczyzna, Rydzewo, Skrodzkie, Sołki, Stoczek, Tama, Turczyn, Wojdy, Wólka Mała, Wólka Piotrowska, Woźnawieś and Wykowo.

Neighbouring gminas
Gmina Rajgród is bordered by the gminas of Bargłów Kościelny, Goniądz, Grajewo, Kalinowo and Prostki.

References

Polish official population figures 2006

Rajgrod
Grajewo County